Cranbrook is a suburb of Townsville in the City of Townsville, Queensland, Australia.

Geography
It is close to the Aitkenvale business district.

History
On 1 July 1968 Cranbrook was named by Queensland Place Names Board after Cranbrook, the Sydney home of Robert Towns.

Holy Spirit School opened on 15 May 1969.

Ignatius Park College opened on 25 August 1969.

Cranbrook State School opened on 27 January 1981.

Education 
Cranbrook State School is a government primary (Prep-6) school for boys and girls at Alice Street. In 2017, the school had an enrolment of 535 students with 44 teachers (39 full-time equivalent) and 25 non-teaching staff (18 full-time equivalent). It includes a special education program. Holy Spirit Catholic School is a Catholic primary (Prep-6) school for boys and girls at Hatchett Street. In 2017, the school had an enrolment of 751 students with 42 teachers (39 full-time equivalent) and 34 non-teaching staff (23 full-time equivalent).

Ignatius Park College is a Catholic secondary (7-12) school for boys at 368-384 Ross River Road. In 2017, the school had an enrolment of 1104 students with 93 teachers (90 full-time equivalent) and 52 non-teaching staff (44 full-time equivalent).

References

Further reading

External links